The 1996 Dubai Tennis Championships was a men's tennis tournament played on outdoor hard courts at the Aviation Club Tennis Centre in Dubai in the United Arab Emirates and was part of the World Series of the 1996 ATP Tour. The tournament ran from 12 February through 18 February 1996. Fourth-seeded Goran Ivanišević won the singles title.

Finals

Singles

 Goran Ivanišević defeated  Albert Costa 6–4, 6–3
 It was Ivanišević's 2nd title of the year and the 20th of his career.

Doubles

 Byron Black /  Grant Connell defeated  Karel Nováček /  Jiří Novák 6–0, 6–1
 It was Black's 1st title of the year and the 12th of his career. It was Connell's 1st title of the year and the 18th of his career.

References

External links
 Official website
 ATP tournament profile

 
Dubai Tennis Championships
Dubai Tennis Championships